Syed Firdous Shamim Naqvi is a Pakistani politician who served as the  leader of the opposition in the Provincial Assembly of Sindh, in office since 24 September 2018 to 8 January 2021. He has been a member of the Provincial Assembly of Sindh, since August 2018. He still serves as a Core Committee member of Pakistan Tehreek-e-Insaf since 1996. He has also served from 2015 to 2019 in the Karachi Municipal Cooperation as Union Council Chairman at UC-18 District East Karachi. Firdous Naqvi is also a Civil Engineer, Construction Manager, and a Business Administrator. Naqvi also remains a Director Makro-Habib since 2005, prior to that he served as Director Business Development Makro-Habib Pakistan, Senior Director Commercial Makro-Habib Pakistan Ltd. Chief Executive Balochistan Concrete and Blocks Ltd., Director Tractebel Power, Karachi (1994–1988), Projects controller RAPCO Roads, Abu Dhabi (1982- 1984) and office Engineer Mergen time Corporation, New Jersey (1979- 1982). Naqvi served as CEO of Noble Project Management (1986-2018). He has served as a Director of Canada Malevo (2004-2011). He has also served as a Director of Sindh Engro Coal Mine Project (2012-2018). He has served for four times on the Central Executive Committee of Association of Builders and Developers. Naqvi remains a prominent director of House of Habib Since 1984.

Early life and education
Naqvi was born on 10 May 1956 in Faisalabad, Pakistan.

He received a degree of Bachelor of Engineering in Civil from the NED University of Engineering and Technology and degree of Masters in Construction Management and Masters in Highways & Design Material from the University of Michigan.

Political career

He joined PTI as a founding member in 1996 and worked closely with Imran Khan in building the party. Naqvi became a member Central executive of Pakistan Tehreek-e-Insaf when it was founded by Imran Khan in 1996, he was appointed its spokesperson on 2007, Naqvi also chaired party's Manifesto Committee for 2013 elections.Naqvi serves as the member of the Central Executive Committee and spokesperson on Commerce & Industry of Pakistan Tehreek-e-Insaf. One of Tehreek-e-Insaf's most prominent members from Karachi. Naqvi still remains Member in Core Committee of Tehreek-e-Insaf since 1996. He was President of PTI Karachi chapter during elections 2018. Under his leadership PTI won 14 out 21 National Assembly seats and 21 out of 44 Provincial Assembly seats. He was elected to the Provincial Assembly of Sindh as a candidate of Pakistan Tehreek-e-Insaf (PTI) from Constituency PS-101 (Karachi East-III) in 2018 Pakistani general election.

In September 2018, he resigned as president of PTI chapter in Karachi.

On 5 September 2018, PTI nominated him as leader of the opposition in the Provincial Assembly of Sindh. On 24 September, he was declared as Leader of Opposition.

On 8 January 2021, he resigned as leader of Opposition of Sindh Assembly.

References

Living people
Pakistan Tehreek-e-Insaf MPAs (Sindh)
People from Faisalabad
Pakistan Tehreek-e-Insaf politicians
Sindh MPAs 2018–2023
NED University of Engineering & Technology alumni
Year of birth missing (living people)
University of Michigan College of Engineering alumni